Rudi Scholtz (born 23 February 1979) is a former Namibian cricketer. Born in South Africa, he was a right-handed batsman and a right-arm medium-fast bowler.

Playing for the Namibia Under-19s, he performed in five matches in the 1998 Under-19 Cricket World Cup. It was in this world cup he managed to bowl one of the best Namibian bowling performance of 5/29 (10 Overs) against England who went on to win the U/19 World Cup. Three years later, he would play at senior level for the first time when representing his adopted country in the 2001 ICC Trophy, held in Canada.

External links
Rudi Scholtz at CricketArchive 
Namibia national under-19 cricket team

1979 births
Namibian cricketers
Living people
South African emigrants to Namibia